Saša Molnar (born 1920, date of death unknown) was a Slovenian alpine skier. He competed in two events at the 1948 Winter Olympics, representing Yugoslavia.

References

1920 births
Year of death missing
Slovenian male alpine skiers
Olympic alpine skiers of Yugoslavia
Alpine skiers at the 1948 Winter Olympics
People from Bled